Rhinodoras boehlkei is a species of thorny catfish found in the upper Amazon basin of Ecuador and Peru.  This species grows to a length of  SL.

References 
 

Doradidae
Fish of South America
Fish of Ecuador
Fish of Peru
Fish described in 1976